Clyde Ellsworth "Buzzy" Wares (March 23, 1886 – May 26, 1964) was an American Major League Baseball shortstop during the second decade of the 20th century and a longtime coach in the Majors. Born in Newberg Township, Michigan, Wares attended Kalamazoo College.

Wares played only one month and one full season of Major League ball. He came to the St. Louis Browns of the American League late in the 1913 campaign, and stayed through 1914. He appeared in 90 games, and batted .220 in 250 at bats, with 55 hits, no home runs and 24 runs batted in. His manager, however, was Branch Rickey, and when Rickey was the general manager of the St. Louis Cardinals of the National League, he hired Wares as a coach in 1930. Wares would remain on the Redbirds' staff through 1952, a string of 23 consecutive seasons, during which time St. Louis won seven NL pennants and five World Series. Wares worked under eight different Cardinal managers in that span.

During his minor league playing career (1905–20), Wares twice led his league in fielding percentage, although he did commit a league-leading 107 errors in 224 games played for Oakland of the Pacific Coast League in 1910. That season, however, Wares led the PCL with 790 assists, and had 1,287 total chances, for a fielding percentage of .917.

Buzzy Wares died at age 78 in South Bend, Indiana.

See also
 List of St. Louis Cardinals coaches

References
Spink, J.G. Taylor, ed., The Baseball Register. St. Louis: The Sporting News, 1949.

External links

 

1886 births
1964 deaths
Baseball coaches from Michigan
Baseball players from Michigan
Hancock Infants players
Houghton Giants players
Little Rock Travelers players
Major League Baseball shortstops
Minor league baseball managers
Montgomery Rebels players
Oakland Oaks (baseball) players
People from Cass County, Michigan
St. Louis Browns players
St. Louis Cardinals coaches
Seattle Rainiers players
Toronto Maple Leafs (International League) players
Wichita Witches players
Zanesville (minor league baseball) players
Zanesville Infants players